Mnqobi Yazo (born; Mnqobi Lindokuhle Msimango) is a South African singer-songwriter. Born and raised in Maphumulo, KwaZulu-Natal, released his first project Iscephu in 2018. After he signed a record deal with Mabala Noise, his debut album Impi (2020), which  incorporated elements of African trap, Afro-pop, and maskandi, was certified platinum in South Africa.

Yazo has also pursued an acting career. In 2020, he made his on-screen feature debut on television drama series The River, and appeared as a guest on the television series Durban Gen (2022).

Career 
Mnqobi began his musical interest as a rapper  while  was still attending  primary school. After his matric he studied Performing Art at the  Creative Arts College and obtained diploma.
His first project EP titled  Icephu was released in 2018. Shortly after he signed a record deal with Mabala Noise, his debut studio album Impi was released on  October 30, 2020. It features Nobuhle, Shwi Nomtekhala, and Musiholiq. The album was certified platinum in South Africa.

In November 2020, he made his screen debut on The River playing a role of Steven.

i-Stiff was released on November 25, 2021.

In February 2022, he landed on a supporting role Durban Gen telenova.

Artistry

Influences
Yazo cited Bhekumuzi Luthuli, Ladysmith Black Mambazo and Oliver Mtukudzi as his major musical influences.

Filmography

Awards 

! 
|-
| 2021
| Himself 
| Newest Find
| 
|

References 

Living people
People from KwaZulu-Natal
South African singers
21st-century South African male singers
Year of birth missing (living people)